Mad Dogs, Midgets and Screw Jobs: The Untold Story of How Montreal Shaped the World of Wrestling is a 2013 book about professional wrestling in Montreal, it was written by Pat Laprade. It won the Wrestling Observer Newsletter award for Best Pro Wrestling Book and was named the best wrestling book of the year by The Law.

References

External links
 Mad Dogs, Midgets and Screw Jobs: The Untold Story of How Montreal Shaped the World of Wrestling on ProWrestlingBooks.com

Professional wrestling books
2013 non-fiction books
Professional wrestling in Montreal
History books about Montreal

Wrestling Observer Newsletter award winners